The depiction of LGBTQ characters in animated series in the 2000s changed significantly from the previous decade. In 1999, Simpsons and The Critic producer Mike Reiss who hoped to do something "good for the gay audience" produced Queer Duck, the first animated TV series with homosexuality as a predominant theme. The show became relatively influential after premiering online on Icebox.com, then later shown on Showtime starting in 2000, and was received well by some in the LGBTQ community. While LGBTQ characters appeared in shows such as The Grim Adventures of Billy & Mandy, Red vs. Blue, and The Boondocks, the ongoing show, American Dad, which premiered in 2005, had an LGBTQ character as a protagonist, Roger. While the gay news anchors Greg Corbin and Terry Bates were recurring characters in the show, Roger, a space alien who lives with the Smith family, has an ambiguous sexuality.

For a further understanding of how these LGBTQ characters fit into the overall history of animation, please read the History of LGBT characters in animation: 2000s page.

2000–04 

The number of animated series with LGBT characters increased from the previous decade. In 2000, Queer Duck premiered, with by Simpsons and The Critic producer Mike Reiss hoping it would do something "good for the gay audience," with the show becoming the first animated TV series to have homosexuality as a predominant theme.  Apart from the aforementioned show, Braceface, Drawn Together, bro'Town, The Venture Bros. would include LGBTQ characters. In contrast, anime such as Descendants of Darkness, Gravitation, Inuyasha, Fruits Basket, Cheeky Angel, and Kino's Journey would all feature LGBTQ characters. The shows during this period set the stage for those to come in 2005 to 2009, the latter part of the decade.

2005–09 

The number of animated series with LGBT characters, from 2005 to 2009, changed from those aired from 2000 to 2004, with the addition of various LGBTQ characters in Western animation. This included a space alien named Roger with an ambiguous sexuality in American Dad, various gay and lesbian characters in Rick & Steve: The Happiest Gay Couple in All the World and Moral Orel. Additionally, the animated series Lizzy the Lezzy, Superjail!, Sit Down, Shut Up, The Goode Family, The Cleveland Show, Archer included various LGBTQ characters in their stories. Even so, most of the LGBTQ characters still appeared in anime such as Paradise Kiss, My-Otome, Kashimashi: Girl Meets Girl, Simoun, Shattered Angels, Macross Frontier, Mnemosyne, Sweet Blue Flowers, and Whispered Words.

See also
 List of yuri anime and manga
 List of LGBT-related films by year
 List of animated films with LGBT characters

References

LGBT
2000s-related lists
Animated
LGBT 2000s
 2000s
 2000s
2000s LGBT-related mass media